Østmarka is a forested area to the east of Oslo and part of the congregation of woodland areas known as Oslomarka. The area is situated within the municipalities Oslo, Lørenskog, Rælingen, Ski and Enebakk. Østmarka is delimited to the west by populated areas of Oslo, to the north of communities of Skårer, Lørenskog and Rælingen and to the east by the lake Øyeren, to the south-east lies Enebakk and to the south-west Sørmarka, another forested area. 

The change from Østmarka to Sørmarka takes place at the lake Langen. Østmarka is marked by its location on top of basement rock (more than 1 billion years old) containing easy-to-see folds that make up valleys and hills in the north-south direction. For this reason the terrain has a lot of hills, no matter where one goes.

Along the upper marine border (about 210 meters) the ice of the last ice age has left large amounts of gravel and sand. Sand, Sandbakken ("Sandy Hill"), Sandbekken ("Sandy Creek") and Grusbakken ("Gravel Hill") are all on about the same elevation. The sand mines at Ødegården have been left there by the ice. Beach snails have been found at Lutvann at an elevation of 200 meters.

Nature reserve
Østmarka nature reserve has an area of 18 square kilometers. It received its status in 1990 and was expanded in 2002. The purpose of the protection is the conservation of a substantial, relatively untouched coniferous forest along with plant and animal life typical for this part of Oslomarka, and which has particular scientific and educational significance. The bulk of the reserve is located in Rausjømarka and is owned by the municipalities Oslo, Lørenskog and Rælingen.

Farms, cabins and restaurants in Østmarka
Mariholtet
Østmarkskapellet
Rustadsaga
Skullerudstua
Sandbakken
Vangen
Losby
Larsbråten
Skjelbreia

Highest peaks

(•) signifies that the trigonometric point is not situated on the peak's highest point.

Largest lakes

Plank Road
During the period when small sawmills were being increasingly used throughout the forests of Oslomarka and the timber export became a substantial industry - from ca 1750 and well into the 19th century - this engendered a big need for transportation. In Østmarka alone there were over 2,000 drivers and 4-5000 horses occupied with moving planks between Øyeren and Kristiania (today Oslo). It was too long to drive from Enebakk via Øyeren and Strømsveien to get to Kristiania. This is why the Plank Road was built. The Plank Road starts at Eikeberg and Børter in Enebakk - it crosses the ice on Børtervann and moves up to Rausjø and turns up towards Vangen and Skjelbreia, further over Eriksvann, Søndre Skytten, Elvåga, across to Nøklevann, Rustadsaga, Østensjøvannet and down to the city. The Plank Road is today open and tagged as a ski track.

See also
 Haukåsen radar

References

Other sources
Østmarka fra A til Å, by Even Saugstad, .

External links

  Presentation of Østmarka in the  Marka database from Skiforeningen

Geography of Oslo
Geography of Akershus
Forests and woodlands of Norway
Marka, Oslo
Plank road